A customer engineer (CE) is a worker  whose primary job scope is to provide a service to customers who have signed a contract with the company. Originally, the term was used by IBM, but now customer engineer is also being used by other companies.

About
Customer engineers are also referred as the customer support engineers or customer service engineers. Most customer engineers provide corporate technical assistance which includes debugging mainframe computers and developing outdated products. Customer engineers need to keep up to date on the latest technical developments in their company's customers. Part of their job description requires servicing special equipment that has broken down or seemingly run its course. Many of the engineers are asked to repair specific equipment and others focus on just helping clients. The role of customer engineer has spread to other companies in different industries such as technology, aviation, and telecommunications. Customer engineers are in charge of repairing large-scale networking problems.

IBM customer engineer (IBM CE)
Originally simply engineer, those who specialized in servicing IBM equipment in use by its customers were designated customer engineers by Tom Watson circa 1942. 

Based on the requirements, an IBM CE could be a Field CE and service many customers around a defined territory, e.g.: Kuala Lumpur, or they could be based at the place of business of a particularly large customer and service only that one customer e.g.: Tenaga Nasional.

NCR customer engineer (NCR CE)
The title of CE or customer engineer is used by National Cash Register (NCR) to designate specially trained personnel who are charged with the installation, maintenance and repair of equipment and systems according to contracts with end users. They can be charged with service of either point of sales (POS) systems or with ATM machines.

References

Engineering occupations
Computing terminology